The 1855 Ohio gubernatorial election was held on October 9, 1855. Incumbent Democratic Governor of Ohio William Medill became governor after the resignation of Reuben Wood to accept a consulship, and Lt. Governor Medill became elected in his own right in 1853. The 1855 election was one of the first major tests of the fledgling Republican Party, then still a coalition of various anti-slavery forces, including former rival Democrats and Whig members. This election led them to quickly dominate Ohio politics for the next half-century.

The election is also unique in that it was a contest of three Governors, past, present, and future. With Allen Trimble having served in the 1820s, William Medill serving at the time of the election, and Salmon Chase succeeding Medill. Trimble proved to be somewhat of a spoiler candidate, leaving Chase to win with only a plurality of the votes.

Republican convention

Candidates
Salmon Chase, former Cincinnati City Councilman, Ohio Senator.
Joseph R. Swan, Associate Justice of the Ohio Supreme Court
Hiram Griswold, defense attorney for John Brown

Results

General election

Results

References

Gubernatorial
1855
Ohio
October 1855 events